Jesus on Extasy (shortcut: JoE) was an electronic rock band from Essen, Germany, formed in 2005. The band was formed in 2005 by the cousins Dorian Deveraux and Chai Deveraux. After their first big show at one of the biggest festivals in Europe Bochum-Total Festival the band signed to Drakkar Entertainment. Subsequently, the band supported L'Âme Immortelle for two dates during their 2006 tour.

History

In 2007 Ophelia Dax, Alicia Vayne and BJ joined Jesus on Extasy. JoE released their first full-length studio album Holy Beauty in March 2007. The album contains a remix of the song Assassinate Me by  Sascha Konietzko of KMFDM. The band toured in support of Letzte Instanz, and later Entwine. During 2007 the band also collaborated with label-mates Xandria on a remix of their single Sisters of the Light.

One of their most recognized songs, "Assassinate Me," is made by Macedonian disc jockey Dj Qche, also known as Borche Armenski. The collaboration between Dj Qche and Jesus on Extasy lead to their biggest international tour called Alter Aliternation.

On May 2, 2008, Jesus on Extasy released their follow-up album, Beloved Enemy. In 2008 the band played some festival gigs followed by a tour with the German band Eisbrecher. On that tour Alicia Vayne left the band for personal reasons.

Due to a shoulder injury BJ had to quit drumming in 2009. Because he did not want to leave the band, he started to play Jesus on Extasy's bass guitar and the new drummer Dino joined the band. During 2009 the band played some festival gigs and announced that they are working on a new album to be released in May/June 2010. Along the way JoE publish a video diary on the internet showing parts of the current production phase. The new album No Gods has been released on August 27 of 2010.

In January 2011, Dorian Deveraux announced his departure from Jesus On Extasy and the launch of his new band, FTANNG! which has released their first single "King Of My World" under a Creative Commons license on February 2, 2011.

On October 11, 2011, a reformed JoE released their fourth album "The Clock" through Farscape Records/Artoffact Records with the song "Lost In Time" being the first single of the new album.

In late 2011, former JoE Bassist BJ started a new project called "Killing the DJ" with former JoE LD/TM Jaymo.

The band called it quits on December 19, 2014.

Members 
Chai Deveraux - guitar, synth, samples, backing vocals, programming (2005–2014)
Dino - drums (2009–2014)
Manja Kaletka- vocals (2011–2014)
Chris - bass guitar, backing vocals (2011–2014)
Dorian Deveraux - vocals, guitar, keyboard, sampling (2005-2011)
Ivy - bass guitar (2005-2006)
BJ - drums, bass guitar, backing vocals (2007-2011)
Alicia Vayne - guitar (2007-2008)
Ophelia Dax - synthesisers, samples (2007)

Timeline

Discography

Albums
Holy Beauty - Drakkar Entertainment, 2007
Beloved Enemy - Drakkar Entertainment, 2008
No Gods - Drakkar Entertainment, 2010
The Clock - Artoffact Records, 2011

EPs
Assassinate Me - self-produced, 2007
Sisters of the Light - Drakkar Entertainment, 2007 (as Xandria Vs. Jesus on Extasy)

Solo albums by band members

Leandra
Metamorphine, 2008 (Drakkar Records)
Isomorphine, 2013 (Drakkar Records)

References

External links

Musical quintets
German alternative rock groups
Industrial rock musical groups
German electronic rock musical groups
German industrial music groups
Glam rock groups
Musical groups established in 2005